Geraldine Mary Fitzgerald (November 24, 1913 – July 17, 2005) was an Academy Award-nominated, Tony Award-nominated, and Emmy-winning Irish stage, film, and television actress. She was a member of the American Theater Hall of Fame  and, in 2020, was listed at number 30 on The Irish Times list of Ireland's greatest film actors.

Early life
Fitzgerald was born in Greystones, County Wicklow, south of Dublin, the daughter of Edith Catherine (née Richards) and Edward Martin FitzGerald, who was a lawyer. Her father was Roman Catholic and her mother was Protestant, but converted to Catholicism.

She studied painting at the Dublin School of Art. Inspired by her aunt, actress Shelah Richards, Fitzgerald began her acting career in 1932 at Dublin's Gate Theatre. After two seasons in Dublin, she moved to London, where she found success in British films including The Mill on the Floss, Turn of the Tide, and Cafe Mascot.

Career

Fitzgerald's success led her to New York and the Broadway stage in 1938. She made her American debut opposite Orson Welles in the Mercury Theatre production of Heartbreak House. Hollywood producer Hal B. Wallis saw her in this production and subsequently signed her to a contract with Warner Bros. She had two significant successes in 1939: a role in the Bette Davis film Dark Victory, and an Academy Award nomination for her supporting performance as Isabella Linton in William Wyler's Wuthering Heights.

She then appeared in Shining Victory (1941), The Gay Sisters (1942), and Watch on the Rhine (1943) for Warner Bros., and Wilson (1944) for 20th Century Fox, but her career was hampered by her frequent clashes with studio management. She lost the role of Brigid O'Shaughnessy, villainess in The Maltese Falcon (1941), after clashes with executive Jack L. Warner. Although she continued to work throughout the 1940s, co-starring with John Garfield in the Warner Bros. crime drama Nobody Lives Forever (1946), the quality of her roles began to diminish and her career lost momentum.

In 1946, shortly after completing work on Three Strangers, she left Hollywood to return to New York City, where she married her second husband, Stuart Scheftel, a grandson of Isidor Straus. She returned to Britain to film So Evil My Love (1948), receiving strong reviews for her performance as an alcoholic adultress, and The Late Edwina Black (1951), before returning to the United States. She became a naturalized United States citizen on April 18, 1955.

The 1950s provided her with few opportunities in film, but during the 1960s she asserted herself as a character actor and her career enjoyed a revival. Among her successful films of this period were Ten North Frederick (1958), The Pawnbroker (1964), and Rachel, Rachel (1968). Her later films included The Mango Tree (1977), for which she received an Australian Film Institute Best Actress nomination, and Harry and Tonto (1974), in a scene opposite Art Carney. In the comedy Arthur (1981), she portrayed Dudley Moore's wealthy and eccentric grandmother, even though she was only 22 years older than Moore. In 1983, she portrayed Rose Kennedy in the miniseries Kennedy with Martin Sheen, and co-starred as Joanne Woodward's mother in the 1985 drama Do You Remember Love. Fitzgerald appeared in the 1983 Rodney Dangerfield comedy Easy Money, the horror film Poltergeist II: The Other Side (1986), and the comedy Arthur 2: On the Rocks (1988). In 1986, she starred alongside Tuesday Weld and River Phoenix in Circle of Violence, a television film about elder abuse.

Fitzgerald returned to stage acting, and won acclaim for her performance in the 1971 revival of Long Day's Journey Into Night. In 1976, she performed as a cabaret singer with the show Streetsongs, which played three successful runs on Broadway and was the subject of a PBS television special. She recorded an album of the show for Harbinger Records, produced by Bill Rudman and Ken Bloom and distributed by Ben Bagley's Painted Smiles label. She also achieved success as a theatre director; in 1982, she became one of the first women to receive a Tony Award nomination for Best Direction of a Play for a production of Mass Appeal. While in New York, Fitzgerald collaborated with playwright and Franciscan brother Jonathan Ringkamp to found the Everyman Theater of Brooklyn, a street theater company. The company performed throughout the city, including at Ethical Culture and La MaMa Experimental Theatre Club, both in Manhattan. The company first performed at La MaMa in September 1972, with a production called Everyman at La MaMa. They then performed The Francis-Day, a musical about Francis of Assisi, at La MaMa in July 1973.

She appeared on television, in such series as Alfred Hitchcock Presents, Robert Montgomery Presents, Naked City, St. Elsewhere, The Golden Girls, and Cagney and Lacey. She had a regular role in the short-lived 1965 CBS serial Our Private World. In 1987, she played a title role in the television pilot Mabel and Max, produced by Barbra Streisand. She received an Emmy Award nomination for a guest role playing Anna in The Golden Girls Mother's Day episode in 1988, and played a different character in the episode "Not Another Monday". She won a Daytime Emmy Award as best actress for her appearance in the NBC Special Treat episode "Rodeo Red and the Runaways".

On February 8, 1960, Fitzgerald was recognized with a star on the Hollywood Walk of Fame, at 6353 Hollywood Boulevard, for her contributions to motion pictures.

Personal life

Fitzgerald married Sir Edward Lindsay-Hogg, 4th Bt. in London on November 18, 1936. She was granted a divorce in Reno on August 30, 1946, after three years of separation. She had one son, director Michael Lindsay-Hogg, by her first marriage, and a daughter, Susan Scheftel, by her second marriage to American businessman Stuart Straus Scheftel, grandson of Ida and Isidor Straus.

Her son's resemblance to Orson Welles, with whom she worked and was linked romantically in the late 1930s, led to rumors that Welles was his biological father. Fitzgerald never confirmed this to her son, but in his 2011 autobiography Lindsay-Hogg wrote that this question was resolved by his mother's close friend Gloria Vanderbilt, who had written that Fitzgerald told her that Welles was the father.

A 2015 biography of Welles by Patrick McGilligan argues that Welles's paternity is unlikely; Fitzgerald left the United States for Ireland in late May 1939, and her son, born early May 1940, was conceived before her return in late October. Welles did not travel overseas during that period.

English actress Tara Fitzgerald is Fitzgerald's great-niece.

Death
Fitzgerald died at age 91 in New York City, following a long battle with Alzheimer's disease. She is buried in Woodlawn Cemetery in The Bronx.

Awards and nominations

 Nominated — Academy Award for Best Supporting Actress - Wuthering Heights (1939)
 Winner — Daytime Emmy Awards Outstanding Individual Achievement in Children's Programming - NBC Special Treat (1975)
 Nominated — Tony Award for Best Direction of a Play - Mass Appeal (1982)
 Nominated — Primetime Emmy Awards Outstanding Guest Performance in a Comedy Series - The Golden Girls (Episode "Mother's Day") (1988)

Filmography

Television

Radio appearances

References

External links

 
 
 
 
 Portrait of Geraldine Fitzgerald c. 1936 by George Hurrell
 Portrait of Geraldine Fitzgerald c. 1939 by Hurrell
 
 Fitzgerald's page on La MaMa Archives Digital Collections
 Geraldine Fitzgerald papers, 1944-1990s (bulk 1970s-1980s), held by the Billy Rose Theatre Division, New York Public Library for the Performing Arts.

1913 births
2005 deaths
20th-century American actresses
20th-century American singers
20th-century American women singers
Actresses from County Wicklow
American film actresses
American stage actresses
American television actresses
Burials at Woodlawn Cemetery (Bronx, New York)
Daytime Emmy Award winners
Deaths from Alzheimer's disease
Deaths from dementia in New York (state)
Irish women singers
Irish emigrants to the United States
Irish film actresses
Irish stage actresses
People with acquired American citizenship
Straus family
Warner Bros. contract players
21st-century American women